This article describes the history of cricket in India from the 1985–86 season to 2000.

Events
From the 1993–94 season, the Duleep Trophy was converted from a knockout competition to a league format.

Several team names and spellings were altered during the 1990s when traditional Indian names were introduced to replace those that were associated with the British Raj.  Most notably, Bombay became Mumbai and the famous venue of Madras became Chennai.

Domestic cricket

Ranji Trophy winners
 1985–86 – Delhi 
 1986–87 – Hyderabad 
 1987–88 – Tamil Nadu 
 1988–89 – Delhi 
 1989–90 – Bengal 
 1990–91 – Haryana 
 1991–92 – Delhi 
 1992–93 – Punjab
 1993–94 – Bombay 
 1994–95 – Bombay 
 1995–96 – Karnataka 
 1996–97 – Mumbai 
 1997–98 – Karnataka 
 1998–99 – Karnataka 
 1999–2000 – Mumbai

Duleep Trophy winners
 1985–86 – West Zone 
 1986–87 – South Zone 
 1987–88 – North Zone 
 1988–89 – North Zone & West Zone (shared) 
 1989–90 – South Zone 
 1990–91 – North Zone 
 1991–92 – North Zone 
 1992–93 – North Zone 
 1993–94 – North Zone 
 1994–95 – North Zone 
 1995–96 – South Zone 
 1996–97 – Central Zone 
 1997–98 – Central Zone & West Zone (shared) 
 1998–99 – Central Zone 
 1999–2000 – North Zone

International tours of India

1986–87 Australia
 1st Test at MA Chidambaram Stadium, Chepauk, Madras – tied match
 2nd Test at Feroz Shah Kotla, Delhi – match drawn
 3rd Test at Wankhede Stadium, Bombay – match drawn

1986–87 Sri Lanka
 1st Test at Modi Stadium, Kanpur – match drawn
 2nd Test at Vidarbha Cricket Association Ground, Nagpur – India won by an innings and 106 runs
 3rd Test at Barabati Stadium, Cuttack – India won by an innings and 67 runs

1986–87 Pakistan
 1st Test at MA Chidambaram Stadium, Chepauk, Madras – match drawn
 2nd Test at Eden Gardens, Calcutta – match drawn
 3rd Test at Sawai Mansingh Stadium, Jaipur – match drawn
 4th Test at Sardar Patel Stadium, Motera, Ahmedabad – match drawn
 5th Test at M Chinnaswamy Stadium, Bangalore – Pakistan won by 16 runs

For details of this tour, see : Pakistani cricket team in India in 1986–87

1987–88 West Indies
 1st Test at Feroz Shah Kotla, Delhi – West Indies won by 5 wickets
 2nd Test at Wankhede Stadium, Bombay – match drawn
 3rd Test at Eden Gardens, Calcutta – match drawn
 4th Test at MA Chidambaram Stadium, Chepauk, Madras – India won by 255 runs

1988–89 New Zealand
 1st Test at M Chinnaswamy Stadium, Bangalore – India won by 172 runs
 2nd Test at Wankhede Stadium, Bombay – New Zealand won by 136 runs
 3rd Test at Lal Bahadur Shastri Stadium, Hyderabad – India won by 10 wickets

1990–91 Sri Lanka
 1st Test at Sector 16 Stadium, Chandigarh – India won by an innings and 8 runs

1991–92 South Africa
This tour marked South Africa's return to official international cricket.  A series of three Limited Overs Internationals was won 2–1 by India.

For details of this tour, see : South African cricket team in India in 1991–92

1992–93 England
 1st Test at Eden Gardens, Calcutta – India won by 8 wickets
 2nd Test at MA Chidambaram Stadium, Chepauk, Madras – India won by an innings and 22 runs
 3rd Test at Wankhede Stadium, Bombay – India won by an innings and 15 runs

For details of this tour, see : English cricket team in India in 1992–93

1992–93 Zimbabwe
 1st Test at Feroz Shah Kotla, Delhi – India won by an innings and 13 runs

1993–94 Sri Lanka
 1st Test at KD Singh Babu Stadium, Lucknow – India won by an innings and 119 runs
 2nd Test at M Chinnaswamy Stadium, Bangalore – India won by an innings and 95 runs
 3rd Test at Sardar Patel Stadium, Motera, Ahmedabad – India won by an innings and 17 runs

1994–95 West Indies
 1st Test at Wankhede Stadium, Bombay – India won by 96 runs
 2nd Test at Vidarbha Cricket Association Ground, Nagpur – match drawn
 3rd Test at Punjab Cricket Association Stadium, Mohali – West Indies won by 243 runs

1995–96 New Zealand
 1st Test at M Chinnaswamy Stadium, Bangalore – India won by 8 wickets
 2nd Test at MA Chidambaram Stadium, Chepauk, Madras – match drawn
 3rd Test at Barabati Stadium, Cuttack – match drawn

1996–97 Australia
 1st Test at Feroz Shah Kotla, Delhi – India won by 7 wickets

1996–97 South Africa
 1st Test at Sardar Patel Stadium, Motera, Ahmedabad – India won by 64 runs
 2nd Test at Eden Gardens, Calcutta – South Africa won by 329 runs
 3rd Test at Modi Stadium, Kanpur – India won by 280 runs

1997–98 Sri Lanka
 1st Test at Punjab Cricket Association Stadium, Mohali – match drawn
 2nd Test at Vidarbha Cricket Association Ground, Nagpur – match drawn
 3rd Test at Wankhede Stadium, Mumbai – match drawn

1997–98 Australia
 1st Test at MA Chidambaram Stadium, Chepauk, Chennai – India won by 179 runs
 2nd Test at Eden Gardens, Calcutta – India won by an innings and 219 runs
 3rd Test at M Chinnaswamy Stadium, Bangalore – Australia won by 8 wickets

1998–99 Pakistan
 1st Test at MA Chidambaram Stadium, Chepauk, Chennai – Pakistan won by 12 runs
 2nd Test at Feroz Shah Kotla, Delhi – India won by 212 runs

1999–2000 New Zealand
 1st Test at Punjab Cricket Association Stadium, Mohali – match drawn
 2nd Test at Modi Stadium, Kanpur – India won by 8 wickets
 3rd Test at Sardar Patel Stadium, Motera, Ahmedabad – match drawn

1999–2000 South Africa
 1st Test at Wankhede Stadium, Mumbai – South Africa Won by 4 wickets
 2nd Test at M Chinnaswamy Stadium, Bangalore – South Africa won by an innings and 71 runs

External sources
 CricketArchive – Itinerary of Events in India

Further reading
 Ramachandra Guha, A Corner of a Foreign Field – An Indian History of a British Sport, Picador, 2001

2000
2000